{{Taxobox
| name               = Chloropicon
| image = Chloropicon sieburthii 2017 Lope dos Santos et al.png
| image_caption = Chloropicon sieburthii, type species
| regnum            = Plantae
| divisio           = Chlorophyta
| classis           = Chloropicophyceae
| ordo              = Chloropicales
| familia           = Chloropicaceae
| genus             = Chloropicon| genus_authority = Lopes dos Santos & Eikrem 2017
|subdivision_ranks = Species
|subdivision = See text.
| type_species = Chloropicon sieburthii| type_species_authority = Lopes dos Santos & Eikrem 2017
}}Chloropicon is a genus of green algae in the class Chloropicophyceae.
Description
Members of this genus are coccoid cells measuring 2–4 µm, characterized by having one green, often crescent-shaped chloroplast shaped with a starch grain, thylakoids that occur singly and in stacks of three, one central nucleus, one mitochondrion located between the nucleus and the chloroplast, 1–2 vacuoles present at the cell periphery that may contain particles, and a smooth surface of the cell wall.
Taxonomy
The name Chloropicon references both its green color (chloro-) and its small size (-picon).
There are 6 species in the genus:
 Chloropicon sieburthii Lopes dos Santos & Eikrem 2017 (type species)Chloropicon primus Lopes dos Santos & Eikrem sp. 2017Chloropicon roscoffensis Lopes dos Santos & Eikrem 2017Chloropicon mariensis Lopes dos Santos & Eikrem 2017Chloropicon laureae Lopes dos Santos & Eikrem 2017Chloropicon maureeniae'' Lopes dos Santos & Eikrem 2017

References

Chlorophyta
Green algae genera